Pernes (or Pernes-en-Artois) is a commune in the Pas-de-Calais department in the Hauts-de-France region of France.

Geography and access
Pernes lies halfway between Saint-Pol-sur-Ternoise and Lillers, on the junction of the D70 and D916 roads.  It is crossed by the river Clarence, the source of which is in the neighbouring village of Sains-lès-Pernes, at a place known as "Le Buich".

The town can be accessed by SNCF TER (Regional Express Train) services to Pernes-Camblain station, with connections to Calais, Boulogne-Sur-Mer, and Lille.

History
Of Roman origin, written evidence of the existence of Pernes dates back to around 823.  The town depended on the wealthy Abbey of Saint-Riquier.  Because of countless invasions, the town's defenses were strengthened over centuries into a true fortress.  The Lords of the Manor built an impregnable castle on a mound surrounded by marshland.  As with many French towns in the Middle Ages, Pernes was governed feudally by a succession of lords.  The first of these authorities were the Counts of St. Pol.  In 1569, they were still the masters of the castle, mill, gardens, marshes and all important buildings within their jurisdiction.

In 1627, the domain and the barony were sold to François of Cuinchy.  His son, in debt, had to yield it to his creditor, Pierre de Predhomme d'Hailly, in 1648.  The town remained under the management of the Cuinchy family until the line died out, in 1772.  Afterwards, the lordship passed to the count of Wassier.  In spite of the emigration of the count abroad, in 1792, the French Revolution did not strip the family of their property rights, as they were of Belgian nationality.

In 1520, the town was host to Francis I, as he prepared for his battle with Henry VIII, that resulted in the Field of the Cloth of Gold .

Population

Places of interest
 A section of wall of the castle, destroyed during the French Revolution.
 The townhall, with its clock dating from 1586.
 St. Peter's church (16th-19th century). The baptismal font is from the beginning of the 16th century.  Former Lords of the manor are buried in here.
 Pernes British Cemetery, a cemetery of 1075 First World War burials, and of 18 graves from the Second World War, totalling 1096 (identified) casualties. The cemetery is located 1 km west on the road from Pernes to Sains-Les-Pernes, the D70 (Avenue du Président Kennedy). Wheelchair access is possible, but only through a side entrance which leads onto a dirt track that runs along the western side of the cemetery. More information is available from the Commonwealth War Graves Commission.
 Pernes had two windmills to provide flour. One, situated at the "Ferté", is still working.  The other, in the Rue du Guit, stopped working several decades ago. There was also formerly a mill that pressed oil.

See also
Communes of the Pas-de-Calais department

References

External links

 Information about Pernes Cemetery on WW1Cemeteries
 Information about Pernes Cemetery from the Commonwealth War Graves Commission

Communes of Pas-de-Calais